Mueang Nakhon Nayok is the capital district (amphoe mueang) of Nakhon Nayok province, central Thailand.

History
Mueang Nakhon Nayok is an ancient city. In the Ayutthaya kingdom it was the eastern frontier city. The historians found the old city wall on three sides, the southern side was protected by the Nakhon Nayok River as a natural city wall.

The district was called Wang Krachom as the office was in Tambon Wang Krachom, on the left bank of the Nakhon Nayok River. In 1896 the government moved the district office to the right bank of the river. The district office was moved to the old provincial court building in 1931. A new district office was opened on 18 January 1953.

The district name was changed to Mueang Nakhon Nayok on 1 January 1939, to correspond with the name of the province. On 1 January 1943, the government downgraded Nakhon Nayok Province and combined it with Prachinburi province, except Ban Na which became part of Saraburi province. During that time the district was called Nakhon Nayok District. On 9 May 1946, the government re-established Nakhon Nayok Province, thus the district was renamed Mueang Nakhon Nayok.

Geography
Neighboring districts are (from the southwest clockwise) Ongkharak, Ban Na of Nakhon Nayok Province, Kaeng Khoi, Muak Lek of Saraburi province, Pak Chong of Nakhon Ratchasima province, Pak Phli of Nakhon Nayok Province and Ban Sang of Prachinburi province.

The Sankamphaeng Range mountainous area is in the northern section of this district. The Nakhon Nayok River and Khlong Tha Dan are important water resources.

Education
 Chulachomklao Royal Military Academy is Phrom Mani Subdistrict, Mueang Nakhon Nayok District.

Administration
The district is divided into 13 sub-districts (tambons), which are further subdivided into 125 villages (mubans). The town (thesaban mueang) Nakhon Nayok covers tambon Nakhon Nayok and parts of Tha Chang, Ban Yai, Wang Krachom, and Phrom Ni. Tha Chang is a township (thesaban tambon) which covers parts of tambon Tha Chang. There are a further 12 tambon administrative organizations (TAO).

References

External links
 Mueang Nakhon Nayok district history (Thai)

Mueang Nakhon Nayok